Newey is an English surname of Old English origin. The name is topographical, meaning someone who lived at a new enclosure.

Notable people with this surname include:

Adrian Newey (born 1958), English racing car designer and engineer
Brandon Newey, American racing driver
Glen Newey (1961–2017), English political philosopher and professor
Gordon Newey, eponymous founder of Aster-Newey / Newey / Gordon Newey / G.N.L. motor manufacturer from 1907–1920
John Newey, English Anglican priest
Tom Newey (born 1982), English footballer
Whitney K. Newey, American professor of economics at the Massachusetts Institute of Technology

References

English-language surnames
Surnames of English origin
Surnames of Old English origin